Seren del Grappa is a comune (municipality) in the province of Belluno in the Italian region of Veneto, located about  northwest of Venice and about  southwest of Belluno.

Seren del Grappa borders the following municipalities: Alano di Piave, Arsiè, Cismon del Grappa, Feltre, Fonzaso, Paderno del Grappa, Quero.

Demographic evolution

References 

Cities and towns in Veneto